José Antonio Terry (October 31, 1846 – December 8, 1910) was an Argentine lawyer and politician, who served as Minister Plenipotentiary of the Argentine Republic.

Biography 
Terry was born in Brazil, during the exile of his parents José Antonio Terry and Sotera Costa. In 1850 he settled with his family in Buenos Aires, performing his primary and secondary studies in the city. He received his doctorate in jurisprudence at the University of Buenos Aires in 1871. At the beginning of his career he was a journalist in the newspapers La Nación and La Prensa, Time later exerted like professor of Finances in the National University.

José A. Terry was deputy and senator of the province of Buenos Aires, and was chosen like deputy of the Argentine nation in 1871. He also served in the post of Minister of the Treasury in the governments of Luis Sáenz Peña, Julio Argentino Roca and Manuel Quintana.

José Antonio Terry was married to Leonor Quirno Costa, daughter of Gregorio José Quirno and Fernanda Costa, belonging to a traditional Creole family of Spanish and French roots. He and his wife were parents of three children who were born deaf: José Antonio, Leonor and Sotera Terry.

His son, José Antonio Terry was married to Amalia Amoedo Vilaró, daughter of Amalia Florencia Vilaró and Hilario Amoedo, belonging to families Amoedo, Canavery and Morel.

José Terry was grandson of Andrés Terry Álvarez, a Spanish who arrived in Buenos Aires towards the year 1790. His paternal ancestor William Terry, an Irish Catholic born in Cork, was an army officer who served in the Irish brigades at the service of James II of England during his exile in France.
The great-grandfather of José Terry, Gabriel Coste, was a French farmer of Collonges-la-Rouge, Corrèze, in France, who emigrated to Argentina around 1760–1770.

References

External links 

familysearch.org

1846 births
1910 deaths
Argentine Ministers of Finance
People from Buenos Aires
Buenos Aires Province politicians
Argentine people of Irish descent
Argentine people of French descent
Argentine people of Spanish descent
Burials at La Recoleta Cemetery
Members of the Buenos Aires Province Chamber of Deputies
Members of the Argentine Senate for Buenos Aires Province
Members of the Buenos Aires Province Senate
Ambassadors of Argentina to Chile